Geocoris floridanus, the Florida big-eyed bug, is a species of big-eyed bug in the family Geocoridae. It is found in North America.

References

Lygaeoidea
Articles created by Qbugbot
Insects described in 1926